Factor, a Latin word meaning "who/which acts", may refer to:

Commerce 
 Factor (agent), a person who acts for, notably a mercantile and colonial agent
 Factor (Scotland), a person or firm managing a Scottish estate
 Factors of production, such a factor is a resource used in the production of goods and services

Science and technology

Biology 
 Coagulation factors, substances essential for blood coagulation
 Environmental factor, any abiotic or biotic factor that affects life
 Enzyme, proteins that catalyze chemical reactions
 Factor B, and factor D, peptides involved in the alternate pathway of immune system complement activation
 Transcription factor, a protein that binds to specific DNA sequences

Computer science and information technology 
 Factor (programming language), a concatenative stack-oriented programming language
 Factor (Unix), a utility for factoring an integer into its prime factors
 Factor, a substring, a subsequence of consecutive symbols in a string
 Authentication factor, a piece of information used to verify a person's identity for security purposes
 Decomposition (computer science), also known as factoring, the organization of computer code
 Enumerated type: a data type consisting of a set of named values, called factor in the R programming language

Other uses in science and technology
 Factor, in the design of experiments, a phenomenon presumed to affect an experiment
 Human factors, a profession that focuses on how people interact with products, tools, or procedures
 Sun protection factor, a unit describing reduction in transmitted ultraviolet light

Mathematics

General mathematics 
 A term in multiplication for a whole number by which a larger whole number can be divided
 Divisor, an integer which evenly divides a number without leaving a remainder
 Factorization, the decomposition of an object into a product of other objects
 Integer factorization, the process of breaking down a composite number into smaller non-trivial divisors
 A coefficient, a multiplicative factor in an expression, usually a number
 The act of forming a factor group or quotient ring in abstract algebra
 A von Neumann algebra, with a trivial center
 Factor (graph theory), a spanning sub graph
 Any finite contiguous sub sequence of a word in group theory

Statistics 
 An independent categorical variable.
 In experimental design, the factor is a category of treatments controlled by the experimenter.
 In factor analysis,  the factors are unobserved underlying hidden variables that explain variability in a set of correlated variables.
The factor by which a vector A Is multipled could be a scalar having its own physical dimension

People 
 Factor (producer), Canadian hip hop artist
 John Factor (1892–1984), British-American Prohibition-era gangster
 Max Factor Sr. (1872–1938), Polish-American businessman and cosmetician
 Max Factor Jr. (1904–1996), son of the above, born Francis Factor

Places
 Factor, Arecibo, Puerto Rico, a barrio

Other uses 
 Factor (chord), a member or component of a chord
 FACTOR, the Foundation to Assist Canadian Talent on Records

See also 
 
 Co-factor (disambiguation)
 Factoring (disambiguation)